16 & 1 is the seventh studio album by Canadian country music group Doc Walker. It was released on August 29, 2011 by Open Road Recordings. The album includes covers of Bob Seger's "Get Out of Denver" and the Crash Test Dummies' "I Think I'll Disappear Now."

16 & 1 was nominated for Country Album of the Year at the 2012 Juno Awards.

Track listing

Chart performance

Singles

References

2011 albums
Doc Walker albums
Open Road Recordings albums